State Highway 95 (abbreviated SH-95) is a state highway in the Panhandle region of the U.S. state of Oklahoma. SH-95 does not have any lettered spur routes.

Route description

SH-95 begins where Farm to Market Road 1290 crosses into Oklahoma from Texas. Feet (meters) after crossing the state line, the highway curves to the west to parallel the state line as it approaches Texhoma. In Texhoma, the route crosses US-54. SH-95 then turns north immediately after the intersection.

SH-95 turns west to run concurrent with the other three routes. SH-95 then splits off to the north at Four Corners. The route then passes through Eva and runs east of Surrey Hills before meeting US-56 just south of Elkhart, Kansas. This intersection serves as SH-95's northern terminus.

History
State Highway 95 began as an unnumbered farm-to-market road. It was first assigned the SH-95 designation between 1950 and 1954. By 1955, US-56 had been established through Oklahoma. Its original route followed the section of SH-95 north of US-64, so SH-95 was truncated back to the US-64 junction. This change was reverted in 1961, and US-56 and SH-95 ran concurrent north of US-64. The following year, US-56 was rerouted over SH-114, leaving SH-95 on its own once again.

Before 2003, SH-95 extended  beyond US-56 to the Kansas state line, connecting to K-27. After KDOT realigned K-27 to run east of Elkhart, ODOT truncated SH-95 to US-56.

Junction list

References

External links

SH-95 at OKHighways

095
Transportation in Texas County, Oklahoma